Slovenia competed in the Eurovision Song Contest 1997, represented by Tanja Ribič and the song "Zbudi se". Ribič was the winner of the 1997 EMA contest, organised by Slovene broadcaster Radiotelevizija Slovenija (RTVSLO).

Before Eurovision

EMA 1997 
EMA 1997 was the 3rd edition of the Slovenian national final format Evrovizijska Melodija (EMA). The competition was used by RTV Slovenija to select Slovenia's entry for the Eurovision Song Contest 1997.

Competing entries 
The competition featured thirteen competing songs written by composers who RTV Slovenija invited for the competition. The composers both created the song and selected the performer for their entry. The invited composers were:

 Aleš Klinar
 Danilo Kocjančič
 Matjaž Vlašič
 Primož Peterca
 Saša Lošić
 Sašo Fajon
 Slavko Avsenik Jr.
 Veno Dolenc

Final 
EMA 1997 took place on 22 February 1997 at the RTV Slovenija studios in Ljubljana, hosted by Mojca Mavec. A public vote selected "Zbudi se" performed by Tanja Ribič as the winner.

At Eurovision
Heading into the final of the contest, RTÉ reported that bookmakers ranked the entry 10th out of the 25 entries. At Eurovision Ribič performed 6th in the running order, following Ireland and preceding Switzerland. At the close of the voting she received 60 points, placing 10th of the 25 competing entries. The Slovene jury awarded its 12 points to Russia.

Voting

References

External links
Slovene National Final 1997

1997
Countries in the Eurovision Song Contest 1997
Eurovision